Seth is a masculine given name, tracing its origin to the biblical figure Seth, the third son of Adam and Eve. The English form is derived from the Greek Σήθ (Sḗth), ultimately from the Hebrew שֵׁת (Šēt).

Notable people with the name include:

Sports
 Seth Ablade (born 1983), Ghanaian soccer player
 Seth Abner (born 1995), American Call of Duty eSports player; known by his gamertag, Scump
 Seth Adams (born 1985), American football player
 Seth Beer (born 1996), American baseball player
 Seth Blair (born 1989), American baseball player
 Seth Collins (born 1996), American football player
 Seth Curry (born 1990), American basketball player
 Seth Enslow (born 1975), American motorcyclist
 Seth Etherton (born 1976), American baseball player
 Seth Greenberg (born 1956), American basketball coach
 Seth Greisinger (born 1975), American baseball player
 Seth Griffith (born 1993), Canadian ice hockey player
 Seth Jarvis (born 2002), Canadian ice hockey player
 Seth Johnson (born 1979), retired former England international footballer
 Seth Joyner (born 1964), American football player
 Seth Kimbrough (born 1982), American BMX rider
 Seth Lugo (born 1989), American baseball player
 Seth Marler (born 1981), American football player
 Seth Martinez (born 1994), American baseball player
 Seth Roland (born 1957), American soccer player and coach
 Seth Stammler (born 1981), American soccer player
 Seth Wescott (born 1976), American snowboarder

Arts and literature
Seth Abramson (born 1976), American poet
Seth Flynn Barkan (born 1980), American poet
Seth Cardew (1934–2016), British potter
Seth Eastman (1808–1875), American painter
Seth Fisher (1972–2006), American comic book artist
Seth Mnookin (born 1972), American writer
Seth Morgan (novelist) (1949–1990), American novelist

Entertainment
 Seth Adkins (born 1989), American actor
 Seth Avett (born 1980), American singer
 Seth Bingham (1882–1972), American organist
 Seth Binzer (born 1974), American musician
 Seth Carr (born 2007), American actor
 Seth Ennis (born 1992), American singer
 Seth Gabel (born 1981), American actor
 Seth Gilliam (born 1968), American actor
 Seth Green (born 1974), American actor
 Seth Herzog (born 1970), American comedian
 Seth Holt (1923–1971), British film director
 Seth Horan, American bass guitarist
 Seth Kinman (1815–1888), early settler and a nationally recognized entertainer
 Seth Lakeman (born 1977), English folk singer
 Seth MacFarlane (born 1973), American television producer
 Seth Meyers (born 1973), American actor and comedian
 Seth Putnam (1968–2011), American vocalist
 Seth Rogen (born 1982), Canadian actor
 Seth Sakai (1932–2007), American actor
 Seth Sentry (born Seth Gabriel Marton; 1983), Australian rapper and singer
 Seth Troxler (born 1985),  American electronic music producer

Politics and military
Seth Barton (1829–1900), American general
Seth W. Brown (1841–1923), American politician
Seth Bullock (1849–1919), American sheriff
Seth Wallace Cobb (1838–1909), American politician
Seth Govind Das (1896–1974), Indian politician
Seth Hammett (born 1946), American politician
Seth Harding (1734–1814), American naval officer
Seth Hastings (1762–1831), American politician
Seth Jermy (1653–1724), British naval officer
Seth Jones (born 1972), American political scientist
Seth Low (1850–1916), American politician
Seth Obeng (born 1945), Ghanaian general
Seth Sendashonga (1951–1998), Rwandan politician
Seth Warner (1743–1784), American soldier
Seth P. Waxman (born 1951), American lawyer

Science
Seth Berkley (born 1956), American epidemiologist
Seth Scott Bishop (1852–1923), American laryngologist
Seth Boyden (1788–1870), American inventor
Seth Lover (1910–1997), American inventor
Seth Roberts (born ?), American psychologist
Seth Shostak (born 1943), American astronomer

Journalism
Seth Davis (born 1970), American sports journalist
Seth Doane (born 1978), American reporter
Seth Godin (born 1960), American author
Seth Goldman (television reporter), American entertainment reporter and producer
Seth Lipsky (born 1946), American newspaper editor

Religion
Seth Farber (born 1966), American rabbi
Seth Joshua (1858–1925), Welsh Revival Evangelist

Pseudonym
Seth (cartoonist) (born 1962), pen name of Canadian cartoonist Gregory Gallant
Patryk "Seth" Sztyber, guitarist of Polish metal band Behemoth
Seth Rollins (born 1986), ring name of American professional wrestler Colby Lopez

Fictional characters
 Major Seth Adams, a character in the western television series Wagon Train
 Seth, a character in the 2012 American comedy movie Wanderlust
Seth Armstrong, a character in the British television series Emmerdale
Seth Brundle, a character in the 1986 film The Fly
Seth Clearwater, a werewolf in the Twilight novels by Stephenie Meyer
Seth Cohen, a character in the television series The O.C.
Seth Davis, a character in the 2000 film Boiler Room
Seth Garin, a character in the 1996 novel The Regulators by Richard Bachman
Seth Gecko, a criminal in the 1996 film From Dusk till Dawn
Seth Hazlitt, a character in the television series Murder, She Wrote
Seth Lord, a character in the play and film The Philadelphia Story
Seth Nightroad, a empress of the Methuselahs in the anime series Trinity Blood
Seth Pecksniff, a character in the Charles Dickens novel Martin Chuzzlewit
Seth Sorenson, a character in the Fablehaven series of novels by Brandon Mull
Seth Starkadder, a character in the 1932 novel Cold Comfort Farm by Stella Gibbons
Seth, a character in the television series Di-Gata Defenders
Seth (Phantasy Star IV), a character from the video game Phantasy Star IV
Seth (Stargate), a character in the television series Stargate SG-1
Seth (The King of Fighters), a character in the game series The King of Fighters
 Seth, playable character in the 2004 video game Fire Emblem: the Sacred Stones
 Seth, an advanced computer in Universal Soldier: The Return which controls many things including a team of universal soldiers.

See also
Seth (disambiguation)
Seth (surname)

Given names of Hebrew language origin
English masculine given names
Jewish given names